The Peel Sessions is an EP of music by The Bonzo Dog Band recorded in 1969.  This is one of a series of original recordings made in the BBC studios for the John Peel shows on BBC Radio 1 known collectively as the Peel Sessions.   It was released in 1990 on Strange Fruit Records under license from BBC Records and Tapes. Distributed by Dutch East India Trading.

Track listing 

"We're Going to Bring It On Home" 4:32.58
"Monster Mash" 3:17.25
"Sofa Head" 5:54.12
"Tent" 2:57.20

Bonzo Dog Doo-Dah Band EPs
Bonzo Dog Band
1990 live albums
1990 EPs
Live EPs